is a Japanese voice actor.

Filmography

Television animation
 Argevollen (xxxx) as Bernard Gaap
 Bakugan Battle Brawlers (xxxx) as Clayf/Glaive
 Bakugan Battle Brawlers New Vestroia (xxxx) as Clayf/Glaive
 Bleach (xxxx) as Chōjirō Sasakibe; Niidaa Sword; Rudobone
 Eureka Seven (xxxx) as Hap
 Ghost in the Shell: Stand Alone Complex (2002–05) as Borma
 Glass Fleet (xxxx) as Hizack
 Godannar (xxxx) as Kagemaru
 High School DxD BorN (xxxx) as Tannin
 Honey and Clover (xxxx) as Yamada's Father (ep 7)
 Honey and Clover II (xxxx) as Yamada's father (ep 3)
 Inuyasha (xxxx) as Kanta's Father
 Ninja Nonsense (xxxx) as Gomorrha
 One Piece (2020) as Dobon, Kurozumi Semimaru
 One Punch Man (2019) as Bakuzan
 Rockman.EXE Stream (2005) as Yamatoman
 Rockman.EXE Beast (2006) as Zoano Yamatoman
 Zegapain (xxxx) as Dao-Yu
 Mobile Suit Gundam SEED Destiny (2004) as Sato (Pilot of Ginn2 in attempt to drop Junius 7 to Earth, appeared in eps 5–7,17 & 41)
 That Time I Got Reincarnated as a Slime (2018) as Geld

Original video animation (OVA)
Ghost in the Shell: Stand Alone Complex - Individual Eleven (2005) as Borma
Ghost in the Shell: Stand Alone Complex - The Laughing Man (2006) as Borma
Kujibiki Unbalance (xxxx) as Kenji Suzuki 2 (tall)

Original net animation (ONA)
 Ghost in the Shell: SAC 2045 (2020) as Borma

Theatrical animation
Ghost in the Shell: Stand Alone Complex - Solid State Society (xxxx) as Borma

Dubbing
Ad Astra as Willie Levant (Sean Blakemore)
The Bold Type as Oliver Grayson (Stephen Conrad Moore)
Me Before You as Nathan (Steve Peacocke)
The Pacific as Pfc. Lew "Chuckler" Juergens (Josh Helman)

References

External links
 

1970 births
Living people
Japanese male video game actors
Japanese male voice actors
Place of birth missing (living people)
20th-century Japanese male actors
21st-century Japanese male actors